Goniurellia octoradiata is a species of tephritid or fruit flies in the genus Goniurellia of the family Tephritidae.

Distribution
Oman.

References

Tephritinae
Insects described in 2002
Diptera of Asia